Veski is a village in Märjamaa Parish, Rapla County in western Estonia.

Actor, theatre director and pedagogue Ants Lauter (1894–1973) was born in Veski.

References

 

Villages in Rapla County